Bakkebø Church is a parish church of the Church of Norway in Eigersund Municipality in Rogaland county, Norway. It is located in the northern part of the town of Egersund. It is one of the two churches for the Egersund parish which is part of the Dalane prosti (deanery) in the Diocese of Stavanger. The white, concrete church was built in a rectangular style in 1960 using designs by the architects Arnstein Arneberg and Olav S. Platou. The church seats about 400 people. It was consecrated on 29 May 1960.

See also
List of churches in Rogaland
Informationen zur Orgel in der Bakkebø Kirke

References

Eigersund
Churches in Rogaland
20th-century Church of Norway church buildings
Churches completed in 1960
1960 establishments in Norway